Hau Kok Tin Hau Temple ( or ) is a Tin Hau temple in Tuen Mun, Hong Kong.

Location
The temple stands by the Tuen Mun River Channel. It is located next to Tin Hau Road in Tuen Mun, within a short distance from the Tuen Mun station of the West Rail line. Initially built at the seashore and facing the sea, the temple is now inland and surrounded by factories since the 1970 and 1980s as a consequence of land reclamation.

History
Being a hub of waterway transport, Tuen Mun attracted fishermen communities in the ancient times. The fishermen wished to enjoy the protection and blessings of the Heavenly Empress, Goddess Tin Hau (Mazu) and built a temple at Hau Kok in Tuen Mun Kau Hui (Tuen Mun Old Market) in 1637 to worship her and pray for safety. During the Ming Dynasty, the To clansmen, who were engaged in the salt business, migrated to Tuen Mun. They developed close ties with local fishermen and worked together for the expansion of the Temple. People living in the walled villages also helped in financing its renovation on a number of occasions. The temple was rebuilt in 1989.

Activities
The Temple has always been well patronized by worshippers. During the Tin Hau Festival (on the 23rd day of the third month in the Chinese calendar) every year, villagers and fishermen hold a series of celebrations in the open space in front of the Temple. They pray for prosperity and peace by staging thanksgiving opera performances as well as dragon and lion dances. Every year, Lunar New Year fair will be organized in the square in front of Tin Hau Temple. Besides, it is also a place for earthen pot gathering.

Transport
Walk along Pui To Road at Exit A of Tuen Mun station (West Rail line) towards Tin Hau Road. The journey takes about 5 minutes. One may take LRT route No. 610, 615 or 615P and alight at Tsing Shan Tsuen stop. One may also take bus route No. 66M at Tsuen Wan station or No. 66X at Olympic station.

See also
 Tin Hau temples in Hong Kong
 Tin Hau Temple, Joss House Bay
 Tin Hau Temple, Causeway Bay
 Tin Hau Temple, Yau Ma Tei

References

External links

 Hau Kok Tin Hau Temple, Hulu Culture

Tin Hau temples in Hong Kong
Tuen Mun